The 2008 Georgetown Hoyas football team was an American football team that represented Georgetown University during the 2008 NCAA Division I FCS football season. Georgetown finished last in the Patriot League.

In their third year under head coach Kevin Kelly, the Hoyas compiled a 2–8 record. Daniel Matheny and Nicholas Umar were the team captains.

The Hoyas were outscored 280 to 96. Their winless (0–5) conference record was the worst in the seven-team Patriot League standings. The Hoyas played only five Patriot League games because their October 4 matchup with Colgate was canceled following a norovirus outbreak at Georgetown. 

Georgetown played its home games at Multi-Sport Field on the university campus in Washington, D.C.

Schedule

References

Georgetown
Georgetown Hoyas football seasons
Georgetown Hoyas football